The Vesulspitze is a mountain of the Samnaun Alps, located near Ischgl in Austria. With an elevation of 3,089 metres above sea level, it is the highest summit of the Samnaun Alps north of the Zeblasjoch.

References

External links
 Vesulspitze on Hikr

Mountains of the Alps
Alpine three-thousanders
Mountains of Tyrol (state)